"The Best Thing About Me Is You" is a song by the Puerto Rican recording artist Ricky Martin, taken from his ninth studio album, Música + Alma + Sexo (2011). It was digitally released as the lead single from the album on November 2, 2010. The song had earlier premiered on radio's Ryan Seacrest show. The original English version of the song features singer Joss Stone, while its Spanish version, "Lo Mejor de Mi Vida Eres Tú", replaces Stone's vocals with Natalia Jiménez. "The Best Thing About Me Is You" was later featured on three of Martin's compilations: Greatest Hits (2011), Playlist: The Very Best of Ricky Martin (2012) and Greatest Hits: Souvenir Edition (2013).

Background and composition
In a Billboard interview, Martin described the track: "I told Desmond -- and I'm not making comparisons -- but "Don't Worry, Be Happy" is great. That's how this song came to be. From being in a very cool place in my life." The song combines the reggae rhythms with Latin and pop in the music and lyrics by Claudia Brant, Desmond Child, Andreas Carlsson, Eric Bazilian and Ricky Martin.

Critical reception
Carlos Quintana from About.com, positively reviewed the track, saying: "this song is probably the most reflective, inspiring and positive of the whole album." Ernesto Lechner from the Los Angeles Times said that "the lyrics of "The Best Thing About Me Is You," a duet with Joss Stone, sound a bit forced in English, the Spanish version of the tune crackles with bonhomie." Joey Guerra from Houston Chronicle praised the Spanish version, saying: "he lightens up a bit on "Lo Mejor de Mi Vida Eres Tú", that boasts an easy chemistry," but criticized the English-language version, calling it: "less successful" because of "Joss Stone’s habitual oversinging." Grace Bastidas from Latina said: "The first single from the album, "Lo Mejor de Mi Vida Eres Tú" features Spanish siren Natalia Jiménez—Joss Stone duets in the English-language track—and is the definition of happiness. There's even some laughing and giggling at the end of the song in case you're not already smiling." Leila Cobo from Billboard said that the song is "a feel-good ditty over a happy reggae beat."

Commercial performance
The single topped the US Hot Latin Songs chart for two weeks and Latin Pop Airplay for five weeks. On other Billboard charts, it reached number seven on Tropical Songs, number thirty-seven on Latin Rhythm Airplay, number forty on Regional Mexican Airplay and number seventy four on the Billboard Hot 100. In Mexico, the song reached number three and was certified Platinum for sales of over 60,000 digital copies. It also charted in European countries, including number twenty-five in Spain.

Music video
The music video was filmed on December 20 and 21, 2010 in Miami, Florida and directed by Carlos Pérez. The video for the English version premiered on Martin's Vevo channel on January 11, 2011. Joss Stone does not appear in the video. The Spanish version of the video was released on Univision and also does not feature Natalia Jiménez.

Live performances
Martin performed the song with Joss Stone for the very first time on The Oprah Winfrey Show on November 2, 2010. He also performed it during the 2011 Música + Alma + Sexo World Tour.

Awards

Formats and track listings
Digital singles
"The Best Thing About Me Is You" featuring Joss Stone – 3:36
"Lo Mejor de Mi Vida Eres Tú" featuring Natalia Jiménez – 3:36
European digital remixes
"The Best Thing About Me Is You" featuring Joss Stone (Jump Smokers Radio Edit) – 4:26
"Lo Mejor de Mi Vida Eres Tú" featuring Natalia Jiménez (Spanish Jump Smokers Radio Edit) – 4:27
"The Best Thing About Me Is You" featuring Joss Stone (Jump Smokers Dance Version) – 5:13
"Lo Mejor de Mi Vida Eres Tú" featuring Natalia Jiménez (Spanish Jump Smokers Dance Version) – 4:42
German digital single
"The Best Thing About Me Is You" featuring Edita – 3:36
Mexican promotional single
"Lo Mejor de Mi Vida Eres Tú" featuring Jenni Rivera (banda version) – 3:29
US Target edition album bonus tracks
"The Best Thing About Me Is You" (Solo Version) – 3:36
"Lo Mejor de Mi Vida Eres Tú" (Solo Version) – 3:38

Charts and certifications

Weekly charts

Year-end charts

Certifications and sales

See also
List of number-one Billboard Top Latin Songs of 2011
List of number-one Billboard Hot Latin Pop Airplay of 2010
List of number-one Billboard Hot Latin Pop Airplay of 2011

References

2010 singles
Ricky Martin songs
Joss Stone songs
Songs written by Desmond Child
Songs written by Andreas Carlsson
Songs written by Eric Bazilian
Songs written by Claudia Brant
LGBT-related songs
Jenni Rivera songs
Songs written by Ricky Martin
2010 songs
Natalia Jiménez songs